The Rage is a 2007 horror film about a mad scientist who injects people with a rage virus in his laboratory in the woods.

The film stars Andrew Divoff and Erin Brown and was directed by Robert Kurtzman. It was first shown at the Fantasia Festival in Canada on July 13, 2007 and released on DVD by the independent company Screen Media Films on February 26, 2008.

The entire film is filmed in and around the town of Crestline, Ohio in the United States.

The music videos for Mushroomhead's "12 Hundred" and "Damage Done" were filmed on the set, and are featured in the film's DVD.

Plot
A mad scientist named Dr. Viktor Vasilienko (Andrew Divoff) is disillusioned with capitalist society and creates a virus that is designed to make people rage with anger. In his hidden laboratory in the woods, he begins testing the virus on innocents. His experiments don't go as planned and his infected victims escape into the wilderness. There, the infection spreads as vultures eat the remains of the test subjects and become out of control with the compulsion to eat human flesh. Five friends, Pris (Sean Serino), her boyfriend Jay (Anthony Clark) and their friends Kat (Erin Brown), Josh (Ryan Hooks) and Olivia (Rachel Scheer) become involved when their RV is attacked by the vultures in the forest.

Cast

Prequel

A series of prequel comic books entitled Robert Kurtzman's Beneath The Valley of The Rage was released by The Scream Factory in April, 2008.

References

External links

 
Official site

2007 films
2007 horror films
2000s English-language films
Films directed by Robert Kurtzman
American independent films
American splatter films
Mad scientist films
Horror films about birds
Films adapted into comics
2007 independent films
2000s American films